Random Killing is a Toronto, Montreal and Oshawa based veteran Canadian punk rock band established in 1984.  The group of childhood friends initially got together to jam some of their favourite punk rock music, just for a shits and giggles.  The fun turned infectious, the jams continued and before long they had written their own songs, played their first shows, played on live television, recorded Take Our Flag (1985), a 7" EP and made their first video of the title track. Their video aired on Rogers Cable, CityTV news, Much Music and won a cash prize at Trinity Square Video.

The band followed up the success of their first release with the following record and cd releases:  This Whole World (1989), Kicked in the Nuts (1990), Welcome (1992), Reissued (1993), Thoughts of Aggression (1994), Urine the 90s Now (1996), Stranded (1997) as well as numerous short run cassettes, demos and enhanced CD-ROMs, some of which were only available at their shows.  Through Raw Energy records Random Killing achieved worldwide record distribution via A&M records, Page Distribution, Black Mark Production and EMI records.  The band's latest 12" record Bring Out Your Dead was released Feb 2023 and is available from CursedBlessings Records and their distributors.

In 1995, Random Killing's song "12", a punk rock parody of Sesame Street's counting song, was re-recorded by Random Killing at CBC Studios in Toronto and released as a series of four animated videos (numbers 2, 3, 4 and 12) by Sesame Street where they aired internationally for more than a decade.  Johnny was a Punk was also recorded at the same session without vocals and turned into a video for the letter "J".

In 1998, the band performed and interviewed live on CTV's Open Mike with Mike Bullard.  After their performance, Mike's team requested if Random Killing could sit in for an interview because they had bounced one of their other guests off the show, a comedian with racist material from NYC...  The interview was unscripted and extra hilarious due to the fact the show had a well stocked bar in the green room.  Mike Bullard later recounted the live interview with Random Killing in an article within one of the major Toronto newspapers.  He made us out to be a bunch of hooligans which is not the way we remember it at all.  However, his version made for good press and a funny story...

Random Killing's song "Undertaker" was included in the documentary "Zombiemania", a feature created for the Space (TV channel) in 2008.

Random Killing have performed from coast-to-coast in Canada and played with Canadian and International notables such as Dayglo Abortions,  D.O.A., Propagandhi, Forgotten Rebels, Ripcordz, Armed and Hammered, Bunchofuckingoofs, Agnostic Front, Bad Brains, Dead Kennedys, Coffin Break, Submachine, The Restarts, UK Subs, The Vibrators and GBH.

Random Killing in one of the longest continuously active punk bands in Canada and are looking forward to celebrating their 40th anniversary in 2024.

Band

Current members 
Mudd  Jim Moore: Co-Founder, Bass

Rusty Talent a.k.a. John Hajdu: Co-Founder, Guitar

Drool a.k.a. Andrew Kiteley: Lyrics, Vocals 

Boneless a.k.a. Chris Hill: Drums

Former Members 
John Robert Neilson: Drums

Kevin Low: Vocals 

Victor Farkas: Vocals

Tony Mastromatteo: Drums / Vocals 

Mike Rosenthal: Drums

Tim Monahan: Drums

Sean Dignan: Drums

Mark Watts: Guitar

Chris Boneless: Touring Guitarist - filled in for Rusty Talent on guitar for a year and a half in the early 2000s while on paternity leave.  Current drummer

Releases 
 Bring Out Your Dead (Cursed Blessings Records, 2023) 12"
 Stranded (Raw Energy Records, 1997) cd
 Urine the 90s Now (Raw Energy Records, 1996) cd
 Thoughts of Aggression (Raw Energy Records, 1994) cd/tape
 Re-issued (Raw Energy Records, 1993) cd/tape
 Welcome... (Raw Energy Records, 1992) cd/tape
 Kicked in the Nuts (Resistance Records, Switzerland - not the white power US label, 1990) 7"
 This Whole World (Aardvark Records, 1989) 12"
 Take Our Flag (Aardvark Records, 1985) 7"

External links 
Random Killing Official site
Random Killing on Facebook

Musical groups established in 1984
Musical groups from Toronto
Canadian hardcore punk groups
1984 establishments in Ontario